The 19th Satellite Awards is an award ceremony honoring the year's outstanding performers, films, television shows, home videos and interactive media, presented by the International Press Academy.

The nominations were announced on December 1, 2014. The winners were announced on February 15, 2015.

The film Birdman led all nominees with ten, including Best Film and Best Director (Alejandro G. Iñárritu), winning three.

Special achievement awards
Auteur Award (for singular vision and unique artistic control over the elements of production) – Martyn Burke

Humanitarian Award (for making a difference in the lives of those in the artistic community and beyond) – Sebastian Junger

Mary Pickford Award (for outstanding contribution to the entertainment industry) – Ellen Burstyn

Nikola Tesla Award (for visionary achievement in filmmaking technology) – Industrial Light & Magic

Breakthrough Performance Award – Antoine Olivier Pilon (Mommy)

Independent Producer of the Year Award – Shlomi Elkabetz

Motion picture winners and nominees

Winners are listed first and highlighted in bold.

Television winners and nominees

Winners are listed first and highlighted in bold.

New Media winners and nominees
{|class="wikitable"
|-
! style="background:#EEDD82; width:50%" | Outstanding Overall Blu-ray/DVD
! style="background:#EEDD82; width:50%" | Outstanding Youth Blu-ray/DVD
|-
| valign="top" |
The Swimmer – Box Office Spectaculars / Grindhouse Releasing / Sony Pictures Entertainment 12 Years a Slave – 20th Century Fox Home Entertainment
 Agatha Christie's Poirot: The Complete Cases Collection – Acorn Media / RLJ Home Ent.
 Borgen: The Complete Series – MHz Networks
 Guardians of the Galaxy – Walt Disney Studios Home Entertainment
 A Hard Day's Night – The Criterion Collection
 How I Met Your Mother: The Complete Series – 20th Century Fox Home Entertainment
 The Man with No Name Trilogy (Remastered) – MGM Home Entertainment
 Muscle Shoals – Magnolia Home Entertainment
 Napoleon Dynamite: 10th Anniversary Edition – 20th Century Fox Home Entertainment
 Sons of Anarchy: The Complete Series – 20th Century Fox Home Entertainment
 Swelter – Well Go USA Entertainment
 We Are the Best! – Magnolia Home Entertainment
 Young Frankenstein: 40th Anniversary Edition – 20th Century Fox Home Entertainment
| valign="top" |How to Train Your Dragon 2 – 20th Century Fox Home Entertainment The Fault in Our Stars – 20th Century Fox Home Entertainment
 Frozen – Walt Disney Studios Home Entertainment
 The Lego Movie – Warner Home Video
|-
! style="background:#EEDD82; width:50%" | Outstanding Mobile Game
! style="background:#EEDD82; width:50%" | Outstanding Platform Action/Adventure Game
|-
| valign="top" |XCOM: Enemy Within for Mobile – 2K Games 80 Days – Inkle
 Hearthstone: Heroes of Warcraft – Blizzard Entertainment
 Monument Valley – Ustwo Games
 The Room Two – Fireproof Games
 Two Dots – Playdots, Inc.
| valign="top" |Forza Horizon 2 – Microsoft Assassin's Creed Unity – Ubisoft
 Borderlands: The Pre-Sequel – 2K Games
 Dark Souls II – Bandai Namco / FromSoftware
 Mario Kart 8 – Nintendo
 Titanfall – Respawn Entertainment
|}

Awards breakdown

Film
Winners:3 / 10 Birdman: Best Actor / Best Film / Best Original Score
2 / 3 Dawn of the Planet of the Apes: Best Film Editing / Best Visual Effects
2 / 3 The Grand Budapest Hotel: Best Art Direction and Production Design / Best Costume Design
2 / 5 Whiplash: Best Supporting Actor / Best Sound (Editing and Mixing)
2 / 7 Boyhood: Best Director / Best Supporting Actress
1 / 1 Citizenfour: Best Documentary Film
1 / 1 Song of the Sea: Best Animated or Mixed Media Film
1 / 1 Still Alice: Best Actress
1 / 1 Tangerines: Best Foreign Language Film
1 / 2 Mr. Turner: Best Cinematography
1 / 2 Virunga: Best Original Song
1 / 2 Nightcrawler: Best Original Screenplay
1 / 4 Into the Woods: Best Ensemble – Motion Picture
1 / 8 The Imitation Game: Best Adapted Screenplay

Losers:
0 / 7 Gone Girl
0 / 5 The Theory of Everything
0 / 4 Noah, Selma
0 / 3 Fury, Inherent Vice, Interstellar, The Lego Movie, Wild
0 / 2 American Sniper, Belle, Foxcatcher, Glen Campbell: I'll Be Me, The Judge, Love Is Strange, Maleficent, Mommy, Snowpiercer, Transformers: Age of Extinction, Two Days, One Night

Television
Winners:
3 / 4 The Knick: Best Actor in a Drama Series / Best Drama Series / Best Ensemble – Television Series
2 / 2 Transparent: Best Actor in a Musical or Comedy Series / Best Musical or Comedy Series
2 / 3 Penny Dreadful: Best Genre Series / Best Supporting Actor in a Series, Miniseries or TV Film
2 / 4 Olive Kitteridge: Best Actress in a Miniseries or TV Film / Best Miniseries
1 / 1 The Americans: Best Actress in a Drama Series
1 / 1 The Mindy Project: Best Actress in a Musical or Comedy Series
1 / 1 Return to Zero: Best Television Film
1 / 2 American Horror Story: Freak Show: Best Supporting Actress in a Series, Miniseries or TV Film
1 / 3 The Normal Heart: Best Actor in a Miniseries or TV Film

Losers:
0 / 4 Fargo
0 / 3 The Honourable Woman, The Leftovers, True Detective
0 / 2 24: Live Another Day, The Affair, Alpha House, The Big Bang Theory, The Fall, Fleming: The Man Who Would Be Bond, Game of Thrones, Halt and Catch Fire, Hannibal, Happy Valley, House of Cards, Louie, Masters of Sex, Orange Is the New Black, Shameless, Silicon Valley, Sons of Anarchy, The Spoils of Babylon, The Trip to Bountiful, Veep

References

External links
 International Press Academy website

Satellite Awards ceremonies
2014 film awards
2014 television awards
2014 video game awards